The Perequê-Áçu River is a river of Rio de Janeiro state in southeastern Brazil.

Mangroves and Rhizophora mangle can be found along the river.

See also
List of rivers of Rio de Janeiro

References

Other sources
Brazilian Ministry of Transport

Rivers of Rio de Janeiro (state)